Consequence (previously Consequence of Sound) is an independently owned New York-based online magazine featuring news, editorials, and reviews of music, movies, and television. In addition, the website also features the Festival Outlook micro-site, which serves as an online database for music festival news and rumors. In 2018, Consequence of Sound launched Consequence Podcast Network.

The website took its original name from the Regina Spektor song "Consequence of Sounds".

History

Consequence of Sound was founded in September 2007 by Alex Young, then a student at Fordham University in The Bronx, New York. In January 2008, Michael Roffman became Editor-in-Chief. In October 2014, Consequence of Sound began covering film and became a part of the Chicago Film Critics Association. In 2016, Consequence of Sound was reorganized under the umbrella of Consequence Media, a digital media, advertising, and marketing firm. In 2018, Consequence of Sound launched the Consequence Podcast Network, averaging over 100,000 downloads in its first month. In 2019, Consequence of Sound partnered with Sony Music for the launch of a music documentary podcast series called The Opus. Also in 2019, Consequence of Sound partnered with StubHub to launch a live content hub and events series.

In 2021, Consequence of Sound launched a redesign of their website, and rebranded to Consequence.

In 2022, Consequence launched its first cover story with Red Hot Chili Peppers.

Influence
Consequence is listed as one of the most influential music websites by Technorati. In 2010, About.com ranked Consequence the year's best music blog, based on "Technorati rankings and the online buzz throughout the year". In the Spring of 2014, Style of Sound calculated that Consequence charted as the second most influential music blog. In 2019, Consequence ranked among the top 10 most influential music blogs by Hypebot.

In 2009, Consequence reported that Paul McCartney and The Killers would headline the 2009 Coachella Valley Music and Arts Festival prior to its lineup announcement.

In 2015, Consequence was the first to break news of LCD Soundsystem's reunion tour.

In 2018, Consequence documented alleged abuse allegations against Dave Matthews Band violinist Boyd Tinsley. Boyd was later fired from the band.

Annual Report

Top 50 Albums

Top 50 Songs

Artist, Band and Rookie of the Year

Top 25 Films

Performance, Filmmaker and Composer of the Year

Top 25 TV Shows

TV Performance and Showrunner(s) of the Year

Comedian of the Year

Top 100 Ever

Cover Stories

References

External links
 
 

Online music magazines published in the United States
Magazines established in 2007
Magazines published in New York City
American film review websites
Music review websites